The Bonn Stadtbahn is a part of the local public transit system in Bonn and the surrounding Rhein-Sieg area, that also includes the Bonn Straßenbahn. Although with six actual Stadtbahn lines (as well as three tram lines) the network is relatively small, two of Bonn's Stadtbahn lines connect to the much larger Cologne Stadtbahn (and are numbered according to that system, not Bonn's).

The Stadtbahn network comprises  of route.  There are 64 stations and stops in the city of Bonn proper, and another 17 in Siegburg and Bad Honnef. Additionally,  of the Stadtbahn is located underground, as are 12 of the Stadtbahn stations.

History 
In the middle of the 1960s Bonn lay at the heart of five different railway enterprises. Besides the Deutsche Bundesbahn (the West German national railway company) there was the independent Cologne-Bonn railway (KBE) and three separate tram concerns:
The tram network operated by the city of Bonn (SWB), which had declined in the 1950s.
The SSB, which operated electrified services in the Rhein-Sieg area between Bonn, Beuel, Siegburg, and Bad Honnef.
The BGM, which operated a tram line from Bonn through Bad Godesberg to Mehlem.
This arrangement was inexpedient for a city which boasted 140,000 inhabitants and served as the seat of government for West Germany. The existing arrangements faced competition from the development of automobile traffic, and the federal government was anxious to transform Bonn from a provincial town to a modern capital. At the time trams were considered outmoded and unmodern, so the government was willing to provide funds for removal and replacement.

In 1967 the Bonn City Council approved a new transportation plan which included an underground railway (U-Bahn) between Bonn and Bad Godesberg; the initial ground breaking took place in October of the same year. The overall concept involved a mixed system of trams (operated by the SSB) and heavy rail (operated by the KBE). However, the KBE went into financial decline at the end of the decade and survived only with the support of the North Rhine-Westphalia government; in this environment expansion was impossible. Instead, the railway lines of the KBE would be used to provide a link between Bonn and the Cologne tram network. To this end, new, lighter rolling stock was introduced that would be more suitable on Cologne's Rhine bridges and subway tunnels. The Siegburg lines had already switched to Stadtbahn rolling stock in 1974. On 22 March 1975, the Bonn Stadtbahn was officially inaugurated.

Routes 

The Bonn Stadtbahn operates over former tram and heavy rail routes, which were either rebuilt for city rail traffic or replaced by underground lines. The only completely new section is the connection over the Südbrücke (South Bridge), which is used by the 66 and 68 lines on the southbound journey from Bonn Hauptbahnhof to Ramersdorf and Bad Honnef.

Stammstrecke 
The "Stammstrecke" (trunk route) is the  segment between Bonn Hauptbahnhof station and Olof-Palme-Allee station, which is served by all Stadtbahn lines except 18, but not by the three tram lines. The majority of the route runs through a tunnel between Hauptbahnhof and Heussallee/Museumsmeile, constructed in 1975, replacing the BGM-operated tram tracks which ran above-ground along the Adenauerallee and down to Bad Godesberg.

Lines 
 

See also  
 Trams in Bonn

References

Inline references

Bibliography

External links 

 SWB Bus und Bahn - official site 
 Track plan of the Bonn tram system, including the Stadtbahn
 Bahnen in Bonn – Historie und neue Ideen 
 Fotodokumentation Bonner Haltestellen mit Hintergrundinformationen 
 Historical Club SWB – We show history  (Summary only)

Light rail in Germany
Tram transport in Germany
Underground rapid transit in Germany
Bonn
Transport in North Rhine-Westphalia
sv:Köln–Bonns stadsbana